Centre Street or Center Street may refer to:

Places

Canada
Centre Street (Calgary), Alberta
Centre Street station (Calgary)
Centre Street, part of  York Regional Road 71, Ontario

Hong Kong
Centre Street (Hong Kong)
Centre Street (constituency)

United States
Centre Street (Baltimore)
Mount Vernon station (Light RailLink), formerly known as Centre Street station
Centre Street (Manhattan), New York
Center Street Historic District (disambiguation), the name of 2 places in the U.S.
Center/Main Street station, Mesa, Arizona, U.S.
Ohio State Route 615, known as Center Street for much of its length

Other uses
Center Street (publisher), an imprint of Hachette Book Group

See also
100 Centre Street, an American legal drama